Råstad is a neighborhood and statistical area (grunnkrets) in Sandefjord municipality, Vestfold County, Norway. The farm name Råstad derives from Roaldsstaðir, from the male name Roald and staðir (place), translating to “the farm which belongs to Roald.” Former written forms of the name have been Roaldstadum (in 1322), Roaldstad (1498), Raastad (1539), and Rolstadt (1575). It was first mentioned in a letter dated to 1322. Only six out of a total of eight Råstad farms are still left today. It is home to Råstad Station which dates to 1885. The railway station has been known as Torp Station since 2008, and is the main railway station for Sandefjord Airport Torp.

The statistical area Råstad, which also can include the peripheral parts of the village as well as the surrounding countryside, has a population of 205.

Råstad is located between Unneberg to the south and Sandefjord Airport, Torp to the north. It is considered a part of the urban settlement Sandefjord, which covers the greater Sandefjord city area and stretches towards Stokke and into peripheral parts of Larvik municipality. The urban settlement Sandefjord has a population of 39,849, of which 39,144 people live within Sandefjord.

References

Villages in Vestfold og Telemark